Sergei Anatolyevich Lysenko (born 1 September 1976) is a former Russian professional football player.

External links
 

1976 births
Living people
Russian footballers
Association football defenders
Russia youth international footballers
FC Tekstilshchik Kamyshin players
FC Chornomorets Odesa players
Russian Premier League players
Ukrainian Premier League players
Russian expatriate footballers
Expatriate footballers in Ukraine